Broadsands Beach is the marketing name given to a small cove located in Watermouth, originally known as Broadstrands Beach, North Devon. It is owned by Watermouth Valley Camping Park. It is accessed by 220 cliff steps from The Old Ilfracombe to Combe Martin Coast Road.

References

External links
 Watermouth Park

Coves of Devon
Beaches of Devon